The Tampa Heights Historic District  is a U.S. historic district in Tampa, Florida. On August 4, 1995, it was added to the U.S. National Register of Historic Places. The district includes Lee Elementary School of Technology World Studies, the first brick school in Hillsborough County, Florida.

Gallery

References

External links
 Hillsborough County listings at National Register of Historic Places
 Map of Tampa Heights Historic District

National Register of Historic Places in Tampa, Florida
Historic districts on the National Register of Historic Places in Florida